Roger William Smith (born 19 February 1945) is an English former footballer and football manager.

A versatile player, he played 92 league games in a five-year career in the English Football League with Walsall and Port Vale, spending the 1965–66 season with Vale either side of two spells with Walsall. He then went to make 286 appearances over the course of six seasons in the Southern League with Nuneaton Borough. He later played for Atherstone Town, before briefly taking the management reins at Tamworth between April 1986 and February 1987.

Playing career

Walsall and Port Vale
Smith began his career with Walsall after leaving Tamworth Grammar School. Bill Moore's "Saddlers" were relegated out of the Second Division in 1962–63, and struggled to avoid the relegation zone of the Third Division in 1963–64 and 1964–65. He scored twice in 53 appearances for the Fellows Park side. He dropped down to the Fourth Division when he joined Port Vale in July 1965. He was a first team regular at Vale Park throughout the 1965–66 season until he suffered an ankle injury in March 1966. He was released by manager Jackie Mudie in July 1966, having scored six goals in 33 league and cup games for the "Valiants", and immediately returned to former club to Walsall. Under the stewardship of Ray Shaw, the club posted a 12th-place finish in the Third Division in 1966–67. He then left the club for a second time.

Nuneaton Borough
Nuneaton Borough secretary-manager Dudley Kernick won his signature, having approached the player unsuccessfully the previous year. He settled in well at the club and the goal he scored in a 2–0 home win over Dover on 11 March 1968 was "one of the best seen at Manor Park for a long time" as he took the ball from the half-way line to strike the ball into the net from 25-yards out. He scored five goals from 50 appearances in the 1967–68 season as "Boro" posted a 15th-place finish in the Southern League Premier Division. A versatile player, able to play full-back, on the wings or as a forward, he scored three goals in 49 games in the 1968–69 campaign as Nuneaton moved up to 11th in the league. However he missed the last six weeks of the season after being diagnosed with jaundice. He returned to fitness in October 1969 and returned to his now familiar full-back role, ending the 1969–70 season with 20 appearances and two goals; Nuneaton finished in the relegation zone but were handed a reprieve. He was switched to midfield for the 1970–71 season, where he made a total of 59 appearances, scoring two goals and coming second in the club's Player of the Year vote. He featured in a remarkable 67 games in the 1971–72 campaign, scoring four goals. He was given a testimonial game in the summer, along with Alan Jones, the opponents being the Nuneaton Borough team of 1966–67. He played 41 times in the 1972–73 season, before manager David Pleat organised a cash-plus-swap deal with Atherstone Town for John Flannagan.

Management career
He served West Midlands (Regional) League club Tamworth as manager between April 1986 and February 1987.

Career statistics
Source:

References

1945 births
Living people
Sportspeople from Tamworth, Staffordshire
English footballers
Association football fullbacks
Association football wingers
Association football forwards
Walsall F.C. players
Port Vale F.C. players
Nuneaton Borough F.C. players
Atherstone Town F.C. players
English Football League players
Southern Football League players
English football managers
Tamworth F.C. managers